The 2021 Russian Artistic Gymnastics Championships was held in Penza, Russia between 10 and 14 March 2021.

Medalists

Results

Women

All-Around

Vault

Uneven Bars

Balance Beam

Floor Exercise

Men

All-Around

References

External links
  Official site

Russian Artistic Gymnastics Championships
Artistic Gymnastics Championships
Russian Artistic Gymnastics Championships
March 2021 sports events in Russia